The 1982–83 Quebec Nordiques season was the Nordiques fourth season in the National Hockey League.  In the 1981–82 season, Quebec recorded their first winning season in the NHL, as they had a record of 34–34–12, earning 80 points, in which they finished fourth in the Adams Division, qualifying for the post-season for the second consecutive season.  The Nordiques lost in the first round of the playoffs to the Boston Bruins.

Off-season
During the off-season, the Nordiques announced that they would not have a team captain for the 1982–83 season, as Andre Dupont only had the position as an interim basis for the second half of the 1981–82 season after team captain Robbie Ftorek was dealt to the New York Rangers.  Expectations were high for the club after their improbable playoff run, in which the team was only one round away from a berth in the Stanley Cup finals.

Regular season
The Nordiques would have a mediocre regular season, as they hovered around the .500 mark for the entire year.  Quebec would set a team record for victories, winning 34 games, however, the team finished with two fewer points than the previous season, as they finished the year with a 34-34-12 record, earning 80 points, and their third consecutive playoff appearance, as they finished in fourth place in the Adams Division.

Offensively, the Nordiques were led by Peter Stastny, who led the club with 124 points, and was second in the league scoring race, finishing behind Wayne Gretzky of the Edmonton Oilers.  Michel Goulet had a breakout season, scoring a team record 57 goals, which was the fourth highest total in the league.  Goulet added 48 assists, earning 105 points, which was good for eighth in the NHL.  Anton Stastny scored 32 goals and 92 points, while Marian Stastny scored 36 goals and 79 points despite missing 20 games due to injuries.  On the blueline, Dave Pichette led the scoring, recording 24 points in 53 games, while Normand Rochefort earned 23 points in 62 games.  Dale Hunter once again provided the team toughness, recording 206 penalty minutes.

In goal, Dan Bouchard was the number one goalie, winning a team best 20 games, while posting a team low GAA of 4.01, as well as recording the only shutout Quebec had during the season.

Season standings

Schedule and results

Playoffs
The Nordiques opened the 1983 Stanley Cup playoffs with a best of five Adams Division semi-final series against the Boston Bruins.  The Nordiques eliminated Boston in seven games in the Division finals the previous season.  The Bruins had the best record in the Adams Division, posting a record of 50-20-10, earning 110 points, which was 30 more than the Nordiques.  The series opened with two games at the Boston Garden, and Quebec stunned the Bruins in the first period, as Peter Stastny had a natural hat trick, as Quebec took a 3-0 lead.  The Bruins came back, led by two goals by Mike O'Connell and one by Barry Pederson to even the game up, setting up overtime.  In the extra period, Barry Pederson scored, as Boston completed the comeback and won the game 4-3.  In the second game, the two teams exchanged goals in the first period, before Dale Hunter gave the Nordiques a 2-1 lead midway through the third period.  The Bruins managed another comeback though, as Boston scored three unanswered goals to win the game 4-2, and take a 2-0 series lead.  The series then moved to Le Colisée for the next two games, and the Nordiques, led by 31 saves by Dan Bouchard, staved off elimination with a 2-1 victory and cut the Bruins series lead in half.  In the fourth game, Bruins goaltender Pete Peeters stole the show, making 38 saves, as Boston held on for a 2-1 win, and eliminated the Nordiques.

Boston Bruins 3, Quebec Nordiques 1

Player statistics

Awards & records
 Second NHL All-Star team: Michel Goulet

Transactions
The Nordiques were involved in the following transactions during the 1982–83 season.

Trades

Waivers

Free agents

Draft picks
Quebec's draft picks from the 1982 NHL Entry Draft which was held at the Montreal Forum in Montreal, Quebec.

References

SHRP Sports
The Internet Hockey Database
Hockey Reference
Goalies Archive

Quebec Nordiques season, 1982-83
Quebec Nordiques seasons
Que